Sulqan Rural District is in Kan District of Tehran County, Tehran province, Iran. At the National Census of 2006, its population was 63,514 in 15,837 households. There were 2,469 inhabitants in 739 households at the following census of 2011. At the most recent census of 2016, the population of the rural district was 5,013 in 1,613 households. The largest of its 16 villages was Vardij, with 778 people.

References 

Tehran County

Rural Districts of Tehran Province

Populated places in Tehran Province

Populated places in Tehran County